Southern Frontier Airlines was a commuter airline based in Canada which was acquired by Time Air on April 25, 1988.

In 1985, Southern Frontier was operating Beechcraft 99 turboprop aircraft from its base in Calgary to Lloydminster, Saskatchewan.  The airline also operated service between Edmonton, Alberta and both Cold Lake, AB and Lloydminster and was formerly known as Southern Frontier Air Transport.

See also 
 List of defunct airlines of Canada

References

Defunct airlines of Canada
Airlines established in 1977
Airlines disestablished in 1987